Richard S. LeFrak (born 1945) is an American billionaire businessman. He is chairman and CEO of LeFrak, a privately held, family-run company based in New York City that owns, develops, and manages real estate. He is one of the biggest landlords in the New York tri-state area.

Early life and education
LeFrak was born in 1945 to a Jewish family in New York City, one of four children of Ethel Stone and real estate developer Samuel J. LeFrak. LeFrak received a B.A. and graduated cum laude from Amherst College. LeFrak also holds a J.D. from Columbia University. In 1998, LeFrak received an honorary doctorate degree from Amherst College.

Career
LeFrak joined his family's real estate firm, LeFrak, in 1968. In 1975 he was appointed president. In 2003, he was elected chairman and CEO following the death of his father, Samuel J. LeFrak. In 1986 LeFrak and his father began building in Jersey City, New Jersey on the site of abandoned piers and rail yards. The area is now known as Newport, a 600-acre neighborhood with 8 office buildings, 13 apartment towers, 2 hotels, an urban beach, schools, a retail mall, and parks.

LeFrak is also credited with leading the LeFrak organization's expansion and diversification outside of the New York area. In 2008 the company purchased a 12-story office building on Hollywood Boulevard as well as a medical building in Beverly Hills, California. In 2012 LeFrak purchased a stake in a South Beach, Miami luxury mixed-use property, including a hotel formerly known as the Gansevoort. The project is expected to open in early 2014 as the eco-minded 1 Hotel Homes.

LeFrak was ranked #16 on the Commercial Observer's Real Estate Power 100 in 2013, # 20 in 2012, #20 in 2011, #10 in 2010, #18 in 2009, and #64 in 2008.

Boards and accolades
LeFrak currently sits on the board of directors of the Prostate Cancer Foundation and is a member of the board of trustees of the American Museum of Natural History. From 1995 to 2007, he was a board member of Smith & Wollensky. Previously, he served on the board of trustees of Amherst College and Trinity School; was a member of the New York State Banking Board; and served as director of BankUnited, Florida.

Philanthropy
LeFrak presides over the Richard S. and Karen LeFrak Charitable Foundation, a private charity whose mission includes the support of charitable organizations.

Harrison has sat on the Board of Trustees of New York-Presbyterian Hospital since 2016.

Controversy
In 2017, St. Joseph's Chapel, the Catholic September 11 Memorial at the World Trade Center, located in the Gateway Plaza in Battery Park City, was threatened with closure due to the St. Peter's parish's reluctance or inability to pay a tripling of its rent by a management company run by LeFrak corporation and partners.

Personal life
He is married to Karen Tucker, a children's author. They live in New York and Southampton.  They have two sons: 
James Tucker LeFrak (born 1973) - vice-chairman and managing director of LeFrak. In 2009, he married Susan Caroline Bierbaum.
Harrison Tucker LeFrak (born 1971) - vice-chairman and managing director of LeFrak.

Politics
LeFrak has contributed to President Donald Trump's 2020 reelection campaign. LeFrak had previously called Trump, a fellow real-estate developer, "a dear friend".

References

1945 births
Living people
Amherst College alumni
American billionaires
American chairpersons of corporations
American chief executives
American corporate directors
American real estate businesspeople
Columbia Law School alumni
Jewish American philanthropists
LeFrak family
American landlords